Undisputed WWE Tag Team Championship exists when one team holds both of the following:
 WWE Raw Tag Team Championship, the men's tag team championship of WWE's Raw brand
WWE SmackDown Tag Team Championship, the men's tag team championship of WWE's SmackDown brand

In the American professional wrestling promotion WWE, the term refers to the tag team that holds and may also defend both championships together, with both titles retaining their individual lineages.

As of February 2023, The Usos (Jey Uso and Jimmy Uso) are the only tag team to achieve the feat after winning the SmackDown Tag Team Championship on the Money in the Bank Kickoff pre-show in July 2021 and the Raw Tag Team Championship on an episode of SmackDown in May 2022.

While similar, this is not to be confused with the Unified WWE Tag Team Championship, which existed from 2009 to 2010. The Unified WWE Tag Team Championship consisted of the World Tag Team Championship and the WWE Tag Team Championship. Both titles were held and defended together under the unified moniker until the World Tag Team Championship was decommissioned in favor of the WWE Tag Team Championship (which would be renamed to Raw Tag Team Championship in 2016).

See also
 Undisputed WWE Universal Championship

WWE tag team championships